Roswitha Eberl (later Krugmann, born 5 June 1958) is an East German sprint canoer who competed in the late 1970s. She won six gold medals at the ICF Canoe Sprint World Championships with two in the K-1 500 m (1978, 1979) and four in the K-4 500 m event (1978, 1979, 1981, 1982).

References

East German female canoeists
1958 births
Living people
ICF Canoe Sprint World Championships medalists in kayak